Jakub Holúbek (born 12 January 1991) is a Slovak professional footballer who plays as a left-back for Ekstraklasa club Piast Gliwice.

International career
Holúbek was called up to the senior Slovakia squad for a 2018 FIFA World Cup qualifier against England in September 2016, but subsequently pulled out with an injury.
He won his first cap in Ljubljana, in October 2016, against Slovenia, when he substituted for Dušan Švento in the 79th minute as a part of the  2018 FIFA World Cup qualification. In the following match, a 3-0 win against Scotland, he was fielded from the start.

Career statistics

Honours

AS Trenčín 
Fortuna Liga: Winners: 2014–15, 2015–16

MŠK Žilina
Fortuna Liga: Winners: 2016–17

Piast Gliwice
Ekstraklasa: Winners: 2018–19

References

External links
AS Trenčín profile 

1991 births
Living people
Sportspeople from Trenčín
Slovakia international footballers
Slovakia under-21 international footballers
Slovak expatriate footballers
Slovak footballers
Association football midfielders
AS Trenčín players
MŠK Žilina players
Piast Gliwice players
Slovak Super Liga players
Ekstraklasa players
Expatriate footballers in Poland
Slovak expatriate sportspeople in Poland